Coveo is a software-as-a-service (SaaS) search engine, powered by artificial intelligence based in Quebec, Canada. The Coveo Relevance Cloud offers ecommerce, customer service, digital workforce, and website search.

History
Coveo Solutions Inc. was founded in 2005 as a spin-off of Copernic Technologies Inc by Laurent Simoneau, Richard Tessier, and Marc Sanfaçon. Laurent Simoneau, Coveo's president and chief executive officer was formerly Copernic's chief operating officer. About 30 employees moved into the new company, with offices at that time in Quebec City and in Palo Alto, California. Louis Têtu, a Quebec native and former CEO of Taleo and Baan, joined Coveo in 2008 as CEO. In 2017, Coveo invested 5 million dollars Canadian into opening up an office in Montreal, with 25 new hires, and approximately 25 more planned for the office at the time. Since then, well over a hundred new employees have joined the Montreal office, which has expanded onto additional floors of the historic Gare Windsor building. As of June 2020, the company had over 500 employees.

In July 2019, Coveo announced the acquisition of Tooso, an AI-based digital commerce engines company. In October 2021, Coveo acquired Qubit, in AI-powered personalization technology for merchandising teams.

Investment

In April 2018, Evergreen Coast Capital led a $100 million investment into Coveo. With this investment, Bill Shaheen of Evergreen joined the Coveo board of directors.

Coveo also received another round of funding in November 2019 for $227 million Canadian lead by OMERS Private Equity yielding a valuation of $1 billion US.

Financials 

Coveo’s LTM total revenue as of Q2 FY’22 was $72M.  As of Q3 FY’22, Coveo’s SaaS Subscription Revenue and total revenue grew 50% and 39% year-over-year, respectively. The company had a Net Expansion Rate of 112% as of Q3 FY’22, and 91% of total revenue came from SaaS subscriptions in Q3 FY’22.

See also 
 Apache Lucene
 Apache Solr
 Elasticsearch
 Apache Nutch
 Algolia
 Lucidworks

References

Companies listed on the Toronto Stock Exchange
Organizations based in Quebec City
Information retrieval organizations
BlackBerry development software